Malachite is a carbonate mineral.

Malachite may also refer to:

 Malachite (color)
 Italian submarine Malachite (1936–1943)
 "Malachite" (song), a 2006 song by Jinn
 Malachite, Colorado, founded by Tom Sharp, now extinct
 Malachite damselflies, in the family Synlestidae
 Malachite Falls and Lake Malachite, in West Fork Foss River Valley, King County, Washington
 Malachite green, an organic molecule used to combat Ichthyophthirius, a protozoan causing white spot disease in aquarium fish
Siproeta stelenes or malachite, a brush-footed butterfly
 SS Malachite (1902), a British coaster that was sunk in the English Channel in 1914
 A character known as Kunzite in the Japanese version of the manga series Sailor Moon and Malachite in the DiC Entertainment English version
 A character from the Cartoon Network Series Steven Universe